Hypostomus commersoni is a species of catfish in the family Loricariidae. It is native to South America, where it occurs in the Paraná River drainage, including the Iguazu River, the Paraguay River, the Río de la Plata, and the Dulce River. It is typically found in rivers with muddy substrates and moderate currents. The water that H. commersoni inhabits usually has a temperature of 16.8 to 27.8 °C (62.2 to 82.0 °F), a pH of 7.2 to 9.2, a turbidity of 23.7 to 442 NTU, an oxygen concentration of 6.1 to 9.1 mg/L, and a conductivity of 1.087 to 2.654 μS/cm.

H. commersoni reaches 60.5 cm (23.8 inches) in total length and can reportedly weigh at least 1.8 kg (4 lbs). It appears in the aquarium trade, where it is often known as Commerson's pleco.

References 

commersoni
Fish described in 1836
Taxa named by Achille Valenciennes
Fish of South America